Vehicle registration plates of Vietnam generally take the form DDL-DDDDD for vehicles. Standard license plates have black characters on white background. Front plates measure 47 × 11 cm, rear ones are 27 × 20. In 2020 and 2021, both plates measure 6 x 12. The current scheme for civilian vehicles omits the letters I, J, O, Q and W, with the letter R reserved for trailers, and includes the Vietnamese D.

History

French protectorate
In French Indochina, license plates were white-on-black on XXX1111 type, XXX is location code. 1111 can be anything (serial numbers).

1978–1984
Vietnamese plates in 1978–1984 were white-on-black and similar to previous one, but had 4 digits then 3 letters. 3 letters are city name, but based on Vietnamese language.

1984–2003
From 1984 to 2003 (current version) is black-on-white, then later green-on-white, with city name. Plates were A 1111 format, then 1A 1111 format, then AA 1111 format, then was going to switch to AAA 111 format, but the plan was cancelled. The leading two symbols are two digits, representing the province/municipality. The exact date of format changing is unknown. In 2012 a blue strip with a "VN" will be added on the left-hand side of the plates, as required by the new ASEAN licensing agreement.

The leading two numerals refer to the various provinces and major municipalities of Vietnam, unless they are letters (AA, AB, AC, and so on) which signify that the car belongs to the Ministry of Defence - in which case the plate will be red. Some plates also carry a red two-letter code following the provincial numerals, with "NG" (for ngoại giao) used for a diplomatic or NGO plate and "LD" for a vehicle belonging to a company which is 100% foreign-owned. If a colored letter (A, B, or C) follows the province code, the vehicle belongs to the local government).

Colors 

 President's cars, Central Government's cars, law enforcement cars  - White on blue
 Private vehicles - Black on white
 Commercial vehicle, construction vehicles - Black on yellow
 Military's cars - White on red
 Diplomat's cars - Black on white with red NG code
 Foreigner-owned cars - Black on white with black NN code

Formats

Regular plates 

The format for regular plates began in 1984, with a modification made in 2010 to increase registration capacity. The system itself resembles an inverted FNI system of France. The registration format of the 2010 system is 12A-345.67, where 12 is the regional code, A is the serial letter, and 345.67 is the registration number. Regular plates have black lettering on white background.

Double-letter serials for special uses also exist for regular plates:

Other formats

Commercial format 
After 1 August 2020, every commercial vehicles in Vietnam must change to yellow color vehicle plate.

State format 
Vehicles of state organizations receive plates with white lettering on blue backgrounds. The format is either 12AB-345.67 or 12A-3456, where 12 is the regional code, AB/A is the serial, 345.67/3456 is the number.

Government format 
The government format follows the regular format, but the regional code is changed to 80.

Motorcycles 
Motorcycles over 50cc receive two-line plates of the 12-A3/456.78 format, which replaced the previous 12-A3/4567 format, with black lettering on white backgrounds.

Motorcycles below 50cc, on the other hand, receive a slightly different 12-AB/345.67 format, also replacing the previous 12-AB/3456 format.

Two-wheel vehicles with electric power source use the 12-MĐ/345.67 format.

Diplomatic plates 

Diplomatic plates have their status codes in red, and the numbers in black on a white background.
 Diplomatic personnel based in Hanoi receive the 80-123-NG-45 format, where the red NG stood for ngoại giao, or "diplomatic", 123 being the country/organization code (e.g. 636 for South Korea), and 45 the registration the number. 01 is reserved for the head of the diplomatic mission, while the rest are given numbers from 02 to 99. Diplomatic mission based outside Hanoi received standard region codes instead of the 80 reserved for Hanoi. For example, diplomatic vehicles based in Da Nang would have a 43-123-NG-45 plate.
 International organizations based in Hanoi receive the 80-123-QT-45 format, where 80 is the code signifying national importance (i.e. being stationed in Hanoi), QT for quốc tế or "International", 123 the country code, and 45 the number (01 for the head of the organization, 02-99 for other members).
 International organizations based outside Hanoi receive a slightly different format of 12-QT-345-67, where 12 is the regional code, 345 being the country code, and 67 the number.

Military format 

Military vehicles bear red plates with white lettering in the format of AB-12-34, where AB is the unit code, and 12-34 being the number.

Military motorcycles receive the two-line AB/123 format, where AB is the unit code, and 123 the number. Mopeds receive an additional letter A after the number.

Temporary plates 
Temporary plates are two-line plates with the T12/345.67 format, where T signifies the temporary nature of the plate, 12 being the regional code and 345.67 being the number.

Codes 
The provincial/municipal codes are listed here:

References

Vietnam
Road transport in Vietnam
Vietnam transport-related lists
 Registration plates